The Gran Premio del Sur (Southern Grand Prix) was a motorsport competition held three times between 1938 and 1942, on public roads in southern Argentina and Chile.

This competition, which was held with Turismo Carretera cars, was created as a complement to the Grand Prix that was organized annually by the Automóvil Club Argentino and which generally took place on roads in the north of the country.

Interrupted by the outbreak of the Second World War, the last edition took place in 1942.

History

References

Motorsport competitions in Argentina
es:Gran Premio del Sur